Alfred James Lechner Jr. (born 1948) is a former United States district judge of the United States District Court for the District of New Jersey.

Education and career

Born in Elizabeth, New Jersey, Lechner was a lieutenant colonel in the United States Marine Corps, and received a Bachelor of Science degree from Xavier University and a Juris Doctor from Notre Dame Law School where he was an editor of the Law Review. He was in private practice in New York City, and in Elizabeth, serving as a special counsel to the Elizabeth, New Jersey Department of Law. He was a judge of the New Jersey Superior Court from 1984 to 1986 and a United States District Judge (DNJ) from 1986 to 2001

Federal judicial service
On April 8, 1986, Lechner was nominated by President Ronald Reagan to a seat on the United States District Court for the District of New Jersey vacated by Judge Frederick Bernard Lacey. Lechner was confirmed by the United States Senate on June 6, 1986, and received his commission on June 9, 1986. Lechner served in that capacity until October 1, 2001, when he resigned.

Post judicial service
Lechner was hired in November 2015 as the President and CEO of the Cause of Action Institute, which is engaged in activities similar to those of the more well-known Judicial Watch. Lechner was in the news due to Cause of Action's Freedom on Information Act litigation brought with respect to the July, 2016 shooting of police in Dallas, Texas.

References

Sources
 

1955 births
Living people
Xavier University alumni
Notre Dame Law School alumni
New Jersey state court judges
Judges of the United States District Court for the District of New Jersey
United States district court judges appointed by Ronald Reagan
20th-century American judges
People from Elizabeth, New Jersey
United States Marine Corps officers
Superior court judges in the United States